"I Can't Get Started", also known as "I Can't Get Started with You" or "I Can't Get Started (with You)", is a popular song. It was written in 1936 by Vernon Duke (music) and Ira Gershwin (lyrics) and introduced that year in the revue Ziegfeld Follies of 1936, where it was performed by Bob Hope and Eve Arden.

Hal Kemp and his Orchestra recorded it and it had a bit of popularity, rising briefly to 14th place on the recording charts. Bunny Berigan's 1937 version was inducted into the Grammy Hall of Fame.

Recordings
Ira Gershwin noted in 1959 that "The sheet-music sale of the song never amounted to much... but an early recording by Bunny Berigan—considered by jazz devotees a sort of classic in its field—may have been a challenge (or incentive) for the great number of recordings that have followed. Not a year has gone by, in the past fifteen or so, that up to a dozen or more new recordings haven't been issued."

Bunny Berigan
Bunny Berigan, a trumpeter with Benny Goodman and Tommy Dorsey, started a band in 1937 and chose "I Can't Get Started" as his theme song. He had been performing the song during the previous year at a club in New York City. He made a recording for Vocalion on April 13, 1936 but gradually he made subtle changes in the arrangement. After forming his band, he recorded "I Can't Get Started" again, this time for  Victor.

Jazz trumpeter Dick Sudhalter noted the changes that had been made since the Vocalion recording. "An introduction—an extended cadenza over four different sustained chords in the key of C—had been added by this time, but otherwise Berigan's routine had not changed since the Vocalion recording. But whereas the Vocalion comes across as a virtuoso performance of a great song, the Victor version presents itself as a kind of concerto, a tour de force for a trumpeter of imagination and daring having impeccable command of his instrument."

The Berigan band's recordings of "I Can't Get Started" and "The Prisoner's Song" were issued together on the twelve-inch Victor record 36208, and were a part of an album of four such records entitled A Symposium of Swing. An edited version was created by Victor on December 4, 1937, and issued as 25728A.

The recording was a hit and reached number 10 on the chart. In 1975, Berigan's 1937 recording of "I Can't Get Started" was inducted into the Grammy Hall of Fame.

Billie Holiday recorded it on September 15, 1938.

Other recordings
 Duke Ellington – Piano in the Foreground (1961)
 Paul Bley Trio – (Paul Bley/Charles Mingus/Art Blakey) – Introducing Paul Bley (1953)
 Hamiet Bluiett with Ted Dunbar –  Ballads and Blues (1994)
 Roy Eldridge – Happy Time (1975)
 Maynard Ferguson - Chameleon (1974)
 Ella Fitzgerald – Newport Jazz Festival: Live at Carnegie Hall (1973)
 Stan Getz with Kenny Barron – Anniversary! (1987)
 Dizzy Gillespie – (1945)
 Stéphane Grappelli, Joe Pass, Niels-Henning Ørsted Pedersen – Tivoli Gardens, Copenhagen, Denmark (1980)
 Billie Holiday with Lester Young – (1938)
 John Lewis with Percy Heath and Chico Hamilton – Grand Encounter (1956)
 Joe Lovano with Tom Harrell – Live at the Village Vanguard (1994)
 Charles Mingus with John Handy – Jazz Portraits: Mingus in Wonderland (1959)
 Joe Pass – Virtuoso No. 4 (1983, recorded in 1973)
 Oscar Peterson – Soft Sands (1957)
 Sonny Rollins – A Night at the Village Vanguard (1957)
Frank Sinatra – No One Cares (1959)
 Lennie Tristano – 1946
 Lester Young with Nat King Cole and Red Callender (1942)
 Lester Young with Oscar Peterson – Lester Young with the Oscar Peterson Trio (1954)
 Jamie Cullum – Pointless Nostalgic (2002)

See also
List of 1930s jazz standards

References

Further reading

External links
 "I Can't Get Started (with You)" at JazzStandards.com
 Ira Gershwin's manuscript for "I Can't Get Started" at The Library of Congress

1936 songs
1930s jazz standards
Songs written for films
Songs with music by Vernon Duke
Songs with lyrics by Ira Gershwin
Al Hirt songs
Billie Holiday songs
Frank Sinatra songs
Nancy Wilson (jazz singer) songs
Grammy Hall of Fame Award recipients
Jazz compositions in B-flat major
Torch songs